Danish landrace or Danish Landrace can refer to any of the following varieties of domestic livestock from Denmark, some of them landraces, some standardized breeds developed from landraces:
 Danish landrace duck, an actual landrace
 Danish Landrace pig, a standardized breed
 Danish landrace goose, an actual landrace
 Danish Landrace goat, a standardized breed
 Danish Landrace sheep, a standardized breed